Alhaji Andrew Kanu is a Sierra Leonean politician from Makeni, Bombali District. Kanu is the mayor of Makeni and he is a member of the ruling All People's Congress (APC).

References

Living people
People from Bombali District
All People's Congress politicians
Mayors of places in Sierra Leone
Year of birth missing (living people)